American International School of Lusaka (AISL) is an American international school in Lusaka, Zambia. It serves students of ages 3–18.

History
The school was established in 1986.

Student body
As of 2015 the school has about 580 students, with 35% of European nationalities, 33% of African nationalities, 24% of North American and South American nationalities, and 8% of Australasian nationalities.

As of 2020 the school now has over 500 students, with The school attracts students from a wide range of nationalities, including approximately 26% European, 31% North and South American, 28% African. Including these nationalities there are 41 nationalities represented. The student to teacher ratio is 1:8 and a 1:1 Laptop/iPad Program.

Education

AISL has MYP, PYP, DP, and the International Baccalaureate Diploma.

Facilities
, AISL has just finished renovations on the primary school and the carpark. This has modernised all of the early years up to grade 6. It has also changed the liberty.

COVID-19 response
On 20 August 2020 AISL has re-opened school to the grades, 7th, 9th, and 12th. Every student has to go through the same entrance at the carpark. They all get hand sanitiser and get the temperature checked. Once inside they have to wear a mask at all times and in class they must sit 1.5 meters apart.

References

External links

 American International School of Lusaka

International schools in Zambia
Private schools in Zambia
Schools in Lusaka
Secondary schools in Zambia
Educational institutions established in 1986
1986 establishments in Zambia